Pope's Eye is the uncompleted foundation for an island fort intended to defend the entrance to Port Phillip in the state of Victoria, Australia.

Features
The fort has been protected as a marine reserve since 1979 and is now part of the Port Phillip Heads Marine National Park. It is named after a naval midshipman and has no religious connotations.

Construction ceased before completion as a fort because improvements in naval gunnery enabled the entrance to Port Phillip (The Rip) and the associated shipping channel to be protected by guns at the nearby Swan Island fort, as well as at Fort Queenscliff and Fort Nepean, making Pope's Eye redundant for military purposes. The reef now hosts a navigation beacon.

It is protected from strong currents and the whole structure is popular with snorkellers and scuba-divers.

Flora and fauna
The reef provides a rich habitat based on the underwater forest of marine algae, such as giant and leathery kelp, that sustains a rich fauna of fish and marine invertebrates, including sponges and soft corals.  The site is part of the Swan Bay and Port Phillip Bay Islands Important Bird Area, identified as such by BirdLife International.  Pope's Eye is an important breeding site for Australasian gannets, which nest on platforms constructed for them as well as on the rocks of the reef, which are also used for roosting by black-faced cormorants and for foraging by ruddy turnstones.  The site is often visited by Australian fur seals and Burrunan (bottlenose) dolphins.

See also

 Protected areas of Victoria

References

Underwater diving sites in Australia
Forts in Australia
Military installations in Victoria (Australia)
Port Phillip
Coastline of Victoria (Australia)
Islands of Victoria (Australia)
Artificial islands of Australia
Artificial reefs
Sea forts
Military history of Victoria (Australia)